Udot or UDOT may refer to the following:
Udot, Federated States of Micronesia, an island in the Federated States of Micronesia
Utah Department of Transportation, in Utah, United States of America